Cronius of Nitria ( – ) was an Egyptian Christian monk who lived in Nitria, Lower Egypt. He was one of the Desert Fathers.

Biography
Cronius was born about 285 A.D. He first lived in a monastery. Later, he left the monastery to serve as a Greek interpreter for Anthony the Great. Afterwards, Cronius became an anchorite and priest in Nitria. His disciples included Isaac of the Cells. He died around 386 A.D.

References

285 births
386 deaths
Egyptian Christian monks
Saints from Roman Egypt
Coptic Orthodox saints
Desert Fathers